"No Time Wasted" is a song by American rapper Polo G, released on February 17, 2023 as the fourth single from his upcoming LP with American producer Southside. It features American rapper Future and was produced by Southside, Smatt Sertified and Lukiepmo.

Composition and lyrics
Polo G performs the chorus, singing: "Uh, I know you waitin' / Gettin' fed up, you runnin' out of patience / Just keep your head up, I told you we would make it / Can't give my meds up, I see too many faces". In his verse, he reflects on life in the streets, and touches on his success. In the second verse, Future focuses on the extent of his success and wealth throughout his musical career, the women around him, and the luxuries he can afford for his loved ones.

Critical reception
Hayley Hynes of HotNewHipHop gave the song a "Very Hottttt" rating.

Armon Sadler of Vibe wrote a mixed review of the song, commenting "Though the message is salient conceptually, there is a lack of conviction in the Chicago rapper's voice. Perhaps that is due to the fact he has 'made it' but lines like 'Ayy, look, I do this sh*t for all my guys that got put under' would hit harder if it sounded like he meant it and kept to the theme throughout his verse. Still, the chorus is very relatable". He added, "All in all, there is a powerful message in 'No Time Wasted' that misses the mark due to its delivery."

Music video
The official music video was released alongside the single. Directed by Sam Lecca, it sees the artists on the football field.

Charts

References

2023 singles
2023 songs
Polo G songs
Future (rapper) songs
Songs written by Polo G
Songs written by Future (rapper)
Songs written by Southside (record producer)
Song recordings produced by Southside (record producer)
Columbia Records singles